Rho Boötis, Latinised from ρ Boötis, is a single, orange-hued star in the northern constellation of Boötes. It is visible to the naked eye with an apparent visual magnitude of 3.59. It is moving toward the Sun with a radial velocity of −13.6 km/s. There is an optical companion, a magnitude 11.5 star, located 34.7 arcseconds away along a position angle of 345° (as of 2013).

This is an evolved K-type giant star, currently on the red-giant branch, with a stellar classification of K4 III and an estimated age of 10 billion years. Since 1943, the spectrum of this star has served as one of the stable anchor points by which other stars are classified. It has around 1.2 times the mass of the Sun and has expanded to 22 times the Sun's girth. Rho Boötis is classified as a RS Canum Venaticorum variable. Koen and Eyer examined the Hipparcos data for this star, and found that it varied with a period of 5.214 days, and an amplitude of 0.0027 magnitudes.

Nomenclature
Rho Boötis is known by several different names, including ρ Boo, 25 Boötis, BD+31° 2628, FK5 534, HD 127665, HIP 71053, HR 5429, and SAO 64202.

References

Rho Bootis A
Gěng Hé sān
Suspected variables
Bootis, Rho
Boötes
Durchmusterung objects
Bootis, 25
127665
071053
5429